Appolonius is a genus of seed bugs in the tribe Drymini
of the family Rhyparochromidae. There are about 12 described species in Appolonius, found in Indomalaya and Oceania.

Species
These 12 species belong to the genus Appolonius:

 Appolonius cincticornis (Walker, 1872)
 Appolonius compactilis (Bergroth, 1918)
 Appolonius crassus (Distant, 1906)
 Appolonius dentatus Chopra & Rustagi, 1982
 Appolonius errabundus Scudder, 1968
 Appolonius indicus Chopra & Rustagi, 1982
 Appolonius oblongus Tomokuni, 1995
 Appolonius picturatus Distant, 1918
 Appolonius quadratus Scudder, 1956
 Appolonius robustus Gross, 1965
 Appolonius salacioloides Slater, 1994
 Appolonius territorialis Gross, 1965

References

External links

 

Drymini